Diego Martín Forlán Corazo (born 19 May 1979) is a Uruguayan professional football manager and former player who played as a forward. Regarded as one of the best forwards of his generation, Forlán is a two-time winner of both the Pichichi Trophy and the European Golden Shoe at club level. With the Uruguay national team, he had huge individual success at the 2010 World Cup, finishing as joint top scorer with five goals, including the goal of the tournament, and winning the Golden Ball as the tournament's best player.

Forlán began his career in his native Uruguay as a youth player with Peñarol and Danubio, before joining Argentine club Independiente. After rising through their youth team and after a successful four-year spell, he sealed a move to England with Manchester United in 2002. His form for United was not as successful as at Independiente, although he won the Premier League in 2002–03 and the FA Cup in 2003–04. In the summer of 2004, he moved on to Spanish side Villarreal. In his first season in Spanish football, he scored 25 league goals and won the Pichichi Trophy. After two more successful seasons with Villarreal, Forlán joined Atlético Madrid, where he once again became the league's top scorer, and became the first player to win the Pichichi Trophy twice since Ronaldo in 1996–97 and 2003–04. Forlán scored in Atlético's 2010 Europa League final victory against Fulham. In 2011, he joined Inter Milan of Italy before moving to Internacional in 2012. After spells in Japan with Cerezo Osaka, back in Uruguay with his boyhood club Peñarol, in India with Mumbai City and in Hong Kong with Kitchee, Forlán retired from professional football in August 2019.

Forlán also had a successful international career, scoring 36 times for his country between his debut in 2002 and his retirement in 2015, including six goals at FIFA World Cups. On 12 July 2011, at the 2011 Copa América in Argentina, which Uruguay won, Forlán earned his 79th international cap in a match against Mexico, breaking the record held since 1986 by goalkeeper Rodolfo Rodríguez. On 20 June 2013, in a match against Nigeria at the 2013 Confederations Cup, Forlán became the first Uruguayan to win 100 caps. Forlán was Uruguay's all-time leading top scorer from 2011 until Luis Suárez overtook him two years later.

Early life and education
Forlán was born and brought up in the Montevideo barrio of Carrasco. His family — which included three brothers, a sister, four cousins, his maternal grandmother and her sister — resided in an apartment building on Potosi street, a short distance from the casino and the rambla. He is the son of former player and Uruguayan international Pablo Forlán.

Forlán attended multiple schools in the private and state sector. He started at Liceo Francés Jules Supervielle in Buceo, but later switched to Erwy School because it was closer to his home. This was followed by Scuola Italiana di Montevideo and then Liceo 15 in Carrasco. He learned English at school from a young age. As a child, Forlán played tennis at Carrasco Lawn Tennis Club in addition to football, which often took place on the streets.

On 14 September 1991, Forlán's sister Alejandra was seriously injured and eventually left handicapped by a car accident that also killed her boyfriend. The cost of the medical bills plunged his family into financial crisis, though this was later averted due to the fundraising efforts of Diego Maradona. Until this point Forlán was also dedicated to tennis, but having been inspired by Maradona's generosity, began to focus more on football in the hope that he might contribute to paying for his sister's treatment himself.

Club career

Early career
Forlán was a boyhood fan of Peñarol and played youth football for both Peñarol and Danubio F.C. In 1995, a 16 year old Forlán moved to France, where he spent four months on trial at AS Nancy, but was ultimately not offered a contract by manager László Bölöni.

Independiente
Forlán received an offer to join Argentine side Independiente through the help of one of his father's contacts, José Omar Pastoriza. He soon accepted, rejecting a simultaneous offer from Boca Juniors. Arriving in Argentina on 28 January 1998, Forlán made his way up the Independiente reserve teams and thanks to strong performances, started training with the first team. Injuries to several forward players who were ahead of him in the pecking order created an opportunity for the young Uruguayan, who made his professional debut on 26 October 1998 in a match against Argentinos Juniors.

Forlán scored 37 goals in 80 league games. His goalscoring attracted the attention of European sides, and in January 2002, Independiente agreed a £6.9 million deal with Middlesbrough of the Premier League; the transfer fee would be paid over 18 installments. Forlán travelled to England expecting to negotiate with Middlesbrough, but at the last minute Manchester United gazumped the Teesside club, offering Independiente the same fee in a single payment, as well as a more lucrative salary for Forlán. On arriving in England, he negotiated with United officials for four hours, then informed the press of his decision. "Manchester United is a big club, so I've decided to go there," he explained. "The thing is, they offered more money than Middlesbrough." He signed for United soon after.

Manchester United
Forlán was signed for Manchester United by Sir Alex Ferguson for £6.9 million on 22 January 2002. He made his debut on 29 January as a 76th-minute substitute for Ole Gunnar Solskjær in a 4–0 away win at Bolton Wanderers. He made his first start in 4–0 home victory over Tottenham Hotspur on 6 March. Forlán made 13 Premier League and five UEFA Champions League appearances in the 2001–02 season but did not score.

On 18 September 2002, Forlán came on as a 56th-minute substitute for Ryan Giggs in a Champions League match versus Maccabi Haifa. He scored his first United goal as an 89th-minute penalty kick in the 5–2 win. His first Premier League goal was a 77th-minute equaliser in a home 1–1 draw against Aston Villa on 26 October. In Forlán's next Premier League game, at home to Southampton on 2 November, he came on as a 79th-minute substitute for United's goalscorer Phil Neville with the score at 1–1, and scored the winner with a dipping shot over Southampton goalkeeper Antti Niemi in the 85th minute. The goal also became notable due to his goal celebration where he ripped off his jersey, but then struggled to put it back on as the game recommenced, with Forlan making a blocked tackle while shirtless.

On 1 December, Forlan scored his first brace for Manchester United with goals in the 64th and 67th minute of an away 2–1 Premier League win at rivals Liverpool. On 17 December 2002, Forlán scored the winning goal as United defeated Chelsea in the quarter-finals of the Football League Cup. On 18 January 2003, Forlán scored a 90th-minute winning goal to again defeat Chelsea, this time in a Premier League match. Manchester United went on to win the Premier League title in 2002–03, and Forlán scored six goals to make him the club's third best-scoring striker that season after Ruud van Nistelrooy and Ole Gunnar Solskjær.

At the start of the 2003–04 season, Forlán played seven Premier League games without scoring. This run was broken on 25 October, when he equalised the score to 1–1 in the 45th minute of a home match versus Fulham, a game which United lost 3–1. Forlán then scored a goal in his three subsequent matches in three different competitions, starting with an extra-time goal in an away League Cup game at Leeds United which Manchester United won 3–2. This was followed by the opener in a 3–0 home Premier League victory over Portsmouth and a sixth-minute goal in a win by the same score over Rangers in the Champions League. In his next Champions League game, he scored the 85th-minute winner for United over Panathinaikos in a 1–0 away victory. On 6 December 2003, Forlán scored two injury-time goals as Manchester United beat Aston Villa 4–0 at home in the Premier League. These were Forlán's last Premier League goals despite him playing 10 more league games over the season. His only other Manchester United goal was in a 3–0 victory over Northampton Town of Division Three on 24 January 2004 in the FA Cup. Diego Forlán did not feature at all in United's 3–0 victory over Millwall in the 2004 FA Cup Final on 22 May 2004.

He started the 2004–05 season with Manchester United and played in a Champions League qualifier against Dinamo București and a 3–1 defeat to Arsenal on 8 August in the 2004 FA Community Shield. His last match for United was their first Premier League game that season, a 1–0 defeat away to Chelsea on 15 August.

Despite not being a success at United, United supporters still sing his name in tribute to the two goals he scored against Liverpool: "He came from Uruguay, he made the Scousers cry" and Forlan admits it still makes him smile.

Villarreal
Forlán was strongly linked with a move to Spanish clubs Levante and Athletic Bilbao, but on 21 August 2004 he signed with Villarreal.

Forlán's debut for Villarreal was on 30 August 2004, starting away to rivals Valencia and scoring his club's goal in the 77th minute of a 2–1 defeat. His next goal came in a home 2–0 win over Real Zaragoza on 3 October, and was followed with an equaliser in a 1–1 draw at Mallorca and the final goal of a 4–0 win at home to Numancia. Between 12 December 2004 and 16 January 2005, Forlán scored seven goals in five Primera División matches, including a brace in a 3–0 home victory over Barcelona on 9 January. On 22 May 2005, he scored his first hat-trick for a European club with all of Villarreal's goals in a 3–3 away draw against eventual league champions Barcelona. A week later he scored two in a 4–1 victory over local rivals Levante as Villarreal ended the season in third, qualifying for the Champions League for the first time in the club's history. Forlán won the 2004–05 Pichichi Trophy for most goals in La Liga, with 25. He also shared the 2005 European Golden Boot with Arsenal striker Thierry Henry.

His goal rate declined in the 2005–06 season as Villarreal underwent several changes, yet the club reached the semi-finals of the Champions League where they were knocked out by Arsenal.

In 2006–07, he ended the season with 19 goals in 36 league appearances.

Atlético Madrid

2007–08 season

Forlán was linked with a transfer jointly with Juan Román Riquelme to Atlético Madrid in exchange for Luis Perea plus cash in June 2007. On 30 June 2007, following the departure of their captain Fernando Torres to Liverpool, Atlético Madrid confirmed that they had agreed to a fee of around €21 million. He returned to England in February 2008 to take part in Atlético's UEFA Cup clash against Bolton Wanderers (the club against whom he made his Manchester United debut), but the side lost out 1–0 on aggregate. In May 2008, Forlán helped Atlético qualify for the Champions League for the first time in over a decade, scoring the winning goal against Deportivo de La Coruña. He ended his first season in Madrid with 23 goals and formed a potent partnership with Argentinian striker Sergio Agüero.

2008–09 season
On 9 May 2009, Forlán scored twice against Espanyol to help Atlético clinch Champions League qualification for a second successive year. Los Rojiblancos were trailing 2–0 at half-time and had seen Luis Perea sent off, but came back to win 3–2 thanks to a goal of the season contender from Forlán, as well as a last minute winner. He also scored crucial goals in wins over Barcelona, Villarreal and Valencia. On 23 May 2009, Forlán scored a hat-trick against Athletic Bilbao, which helped him win the La Liga Pichichi Trophy, as well as the European Golden Boot for a second time. He ended the 2008–09 season with a very impressive 32 goals in 33 matches.

2009–10 season

Forlán started the 2009–10 season slowly, and struggled for form as Atlético made their worst start to a league season since their relegation in 2000. On 24 October 2009, Forlán scored a penalty and missed another as Atlético were held to a 1–1 draw at home against Mallorca, who had played the majority of the second half with just nine players on the field. The disappointing result and performance led to protests from Atlético supporters, as well as criticism for Forlán, who was subsequently left out of the squad for the next game. Atlético started to improve after the arrival new manager Quique Sánchez Flores, and once again, Forlán flourished in the second half of the season, as Atlético reached the finals of both the Europa League and Copa del Rey. On 14 February 2010, Forlán scored the first goal as Atlético beat Barcelona 2–1 at the Vicente Calderón, inflicting the eventual Champions only league defeat of the season. On 22 April 2010, Forlán scored the only goal of the game in Atlético's Europa League semi-final first leg at home to Liverpool. A week later, Liverpool took the tie to extra time before taking a 2–1 aggregate lead. Forlán then scored again to make it 2–2 on aggregate, giving Atlético the away goal they needed to reach the final, in which they played against Fulham at Volksparkstadion, Hamburg, on 12 May. Forlán scored twice against Fulham in the final, in a 2–1 win and was awarded man of the match. He ended the season with a total of 28 goals, including six in Atlético's successful Europa League campaign.

2010–11 season
The 2010–11 season began with another trophy for Forlán and Atlético, winning the UEFA Super Cup, beating Inter Milan 2–0 in Monaco on 27 August 2010. Again Forlán started the season slowly, and despite finding the net three times in the opening two league games, he then went 12 matches in all competitions without a goal before finally scoring a double in a 3–0 win against Osasuna on 13 November.

Inter Milan
On 29 August 2011, it was confirmed that Diego Forlán had joined Inter Milan as a replacement for the departing Samuel Eto'o. No financial details were announced but it is believed the 32-year-old signed an initial two-year deal. He made his debut on 11 September 2011, scoring with a high left foot shot in a 4–3 defeat at Sicilian club Palermo. On 4 March 2012, Forlán scored his second goal for Inter against Catania in a 2–2 draw. In April, Forlán declared his loyalty to Inter and his intention to stay when he told Sky Sports that "I want to stay at Inter. You haven't seen the real Forlán yet... I wouldn't want to leave Inter like this. I like challenges and I wouldn't want to leave when the team are not in a good position." In June, his father confirmed the belief that the striker would see out his contract with the Nerazzurri. On 5 July, however, after only scoring twice in 22 appearances, the Italian club confirmed that he had been released, terminating the final year of his contract. Forlán has stated that his poor performance with the Nerazzuri was due to being played out of position. In addition, former Inter and Uruguay player Álvaro Recoba believed that his compatriot struggled at Inter due to the success of his predecessor Samuel Eto'o, which led Forlán to fail to live up to expectations.

Internacional
On 6 July 2012, after terminating his contract with Inter, Forlán signed a three-year deal with Brazilian club Internacional. He was also linked to Mexican teams Tigres UANL and Club América. In January 2013, Forlán was linked with another Mexican team, the recently promoted Club León. At León, Forlán had the chance to play the 2013 Copa Libertadores; Internacional, however, retained Forlán's services for the 2013 season.

On 28 July 2012, he made his debut for the Brazilian club against Vasco da Gama. Forlán scored his first two goals for Internacional in a 4–1 win against Flamengo. Forlán also helped the club win 2013 Campeonato Gaúcho, scoring nine goals, the highest total at the tournament.

Cerezo Osaka
On 22 January 2014, Forlán signed an 18-month deal with Japanese J1 League side Cerezo Osaka. He made his AFC Champions League debut in a 1–1 draw with Pohang Steelers, and his J. League debut in a 1–0 loss against defending champions Sanfrecce Hiroshima. He scored his first goal for Cerezo in a 4–0 win over Buriram United in an AFC Champions League match. On 12 April, Forlán scored two goals in the Osaka derby against local club rivals Gamba Osaka. He scored a crucial goal against Shandong Luneng on 23 April to put his team through to the knockout stage of the AFC Champions League. Cerezo Osaka were knocked out in the first round by Guangzhou Evergrande, losing 5–1 at home in the first leg. In spite of the disappointing home defeat, they managed to secure a 1–0 away win after an own goal by Liao Lisheng. However, this was not enough to overcome the 5–2 aggregate lead.

Having been relegated in his first season to J2 League, he started off the new campaign with a goal against Tokyo Verdy drawing 1–1. Forlán scored his first hat-trick against Kyoto Sanga FC on 29 April 2015, his side winning 3–0.

Peñarol
On 10 July 2015, Forlán signed an 18-month contract with his boyhood club Peñarol. In his only season at the club, he scored eight goals in 31 appearances as Peñarol won the championship title. On 14 June 2016 at a press conference, Forlán said he would be leaving the club.

Mumbai City
In August 2016, Forlán signed a three-month deal with Indian Super League club Mumbai City. He scored a hat-trick against Kerala Blasters in their 5–0 win on 19 November.

Mumbai finished first in the league table and progressed to the semi-final of the playoffs where they would face ATK. After conceding an early goal, Mumbai equalised and soon took the lead from the headers of Leo Costa and Gerson Vieira. In both cases the free kicks were taken by Forlán. Forlán received a red card in the second half as ATK won the match 3–2.

Kitchee

On 4 January 2018, Forlán joined Hong Kong Premier League club Kitchee. He made his debut for Kitchee on 14 January 2018, coming off the bench in the 88th minute in a 2–2 draw against Southern. On 28 January, Forlán scored his first and second goals for Kitchee in a 7–0 victory over Biu Chun Rangers. He scored a hat-trick in a 5–1 win against Lee Man FC in the following match. Forlán played in Kitchee's 1–0 victory over Kashiwa Reysol in the 2018 AFC Champions League, helping Kitchee to become the first-ever team from Hong Kong to win a match in AFC Champions League history. On 13 May 2018, Forlán played his final match with the club, featuring in the first 56 minutes of a 2–0 victory, and went on to win the Hong Kong Premier League that season.

Retirement
A year after leaving Kitchee, Forlán announced his retirement from professional football on 7 August 2019.

International career
Forlán's 100th cap coming in the 2013 FIFA Confederations Cup match against Nigeria. On 11 October 2011, he scored his 32nd goal, which made him Uruguay's top scorer of all time in official matches, beating Héctor Scarone who had held the record alone with 31 goals since 1930. (Scarone scored 42 goals in total, but 11 of them were in unofficial matches).

2002 FIFA World Cup

Forlán made his debut for Uruguay on 27 March 2002, scoring his first goal in a 3–2 friendly defeat against Saudi Arabia. During the 2002 World Cup, he scored a volley on 11 June 2002 in the group stage 3–3 draw against Senegal. Despite coming from three goals down to draw the game, Uruguay were eliminated from the tournament along with France in Group A. Diego Forlán and Youri Djorkaeff were, respectively, members of the Uruguay and France squads that met in the 2002 World Cup, in Group A. Their respective fathers, Pablo and Jean, featured in the match between Uruguay and France at the 1966 World Cup, which was also in Group A.

2004 and 2007 Copa América
Forlán wore the number 21 for Uruguay at the 2004 Copa América in Peru, shortly before his transfer from Manchester United to Villarreal. He played all six games as they, under the management of Jorge Fossati, came third. Forlán's only goal was in the 2–1 victory over Ecuador, Uruguay's only group win. They advanced in third place out of four in the group.

Forlán scored against Brazil in the 35th minute of the 2007 Copa América semi-final. However, he missed his shot during the subsequent penalty shoot-out, which Brazil ultimately won 5–4.

2010 FIFA World Cup

On 17 June 2008, Forlán scored a hat-trick in a World Cup qualifying game against Peru.

On 16 June 2010, during Uruguay's second group game in the 2010 World Cup against South Africa, Forlán opened the scoring with a right footed long range effort. Later in the game, Forlán scored from the penalty spot, shooting high into the net for his second and also had a hand in Uruguay's third, in a 3–0 win over the host nation. On 2 July 2010, Forlán scored a free kick against Ghana to equalise in the quarter-final. The game ended 1–1 and Uruguay advanced to the semi-finals after defeating Ghana 4–2 in the penalty shootout. On 6 July 2010, Forlán scored another long range goal, this time with his left foot to equalise against the Netherlands in the semi-final. Despite a half-time score of 1–1, Uruguay eventually lost 3–2 as the Dutch advanced to the final. Forlán became the first player since Lothar Matthäus in 1990 to score three goals from outside the penalty area in one tournament. On 10 July 2010, Forlán scored for the final time in the tournament as he netted a well-executed volley from the edge of the area to give Uruguay the lead. This goal, from a pass by Egidio Arévalo Ríos, was selected by FIFA as the Goal of the Tournament. Forlán then hit the crossbar with the final kick of the game from a free kick as they lost to Germany 3–2 in the third place play-off. Forlán was awarded the Golden Ball as the tournament's best player. He was also picked for the team of the tournament, and was the joint top scorer at the World Cup with five goals.

2011 Copa América

On 24 July 2011, Forlán scored twice after Luis Suárez's opening goal helping Uruguay win their 15th Copa América title and became Uruguay's joint top scorer at international level, his 31 goals matching those of Héctor Scarone after beating Paraguay 3–0 in the final. Forlán's father and grandfather were also South American champions with Uruguay over a period spanning the 95 years of the world's oldest active tournament.

2013 FIFA Confederations Cup

On 16 June 2013, Forlán appeared as a 69th-minute substitute in Uruguay's opening 2013 Confederations Cup match against Spain. In Uruguay's second group game, a match where he won his 100th cap for his country, Forlán scored the winning goal to defeat Nigeria 2–1. He was subsequently rested for the next match against Tahiti. He was again in the starting line-up as Uruguay lost 1–2 to Brazil in the semi-final, where he had a penalty kick saved by Brazilian goalkeeper Júlio César.

2014 FIFA World Cup
Forlán was a part of the Uruguay squad for the 2014 World Cup in Brazil. At the age of 35, he started the opening match against group underdogs Costa Rica in place of the absent Luis Suárez. He had a deflected shot saved by Costa Rican goalkeeper Keylor Navas as Uruguay lost the game 3–1. Forlán did not appear again until the Round of 16, where Uruguay were beaten 2–0 by Colombia.

Retirement
On 11 March 2015, Forlán announced his retirement from the national team. He represented Uruguay with 112 caps, scoring 36 times.

Style of play
A talented, technically gifted, hardworking and creative player, with an eye for goal, Forlán was a quick, clever, complete and versatile forward, with a good positional sense, who was capable of playing anywhere along the front line. He was deployed as a main striker (his favoured position), as a supporting forward, as an attacking midfielder, and even as a winger, often drifting onto the flank to begin attacking plays. He was capable of scoring with either foot, both from inside and outside the area; in fact, Forlán was most known for his powerful and accurate long range shots, which made him a large threat if given space outside the box. Alongside this, Forlán was also an accurate set-piece and penalty kick taker. In addition to his accurate finishing, movement, and goalscoring ability, Forlán was a skilful player, gifted with good technical ability and ball control, as well as good vision, passing ability, intelligence, and awareness on the ball; these attributes also enabled him to be deployed in a more creative role, in which he could play-off of other players and drop into deeper positions to link-up the midfield with the attack, making him a capable assist provider. In addition to his footballing skills, Forlán was also praised for his leadership, longevity and determination throughout his career.

Coaching career
On 20 December 2019, Forlán was appointed as manager of his former club Peñarol. He was sacked on 1 September 2020, after winning just four of his eleven games in charge. On 17 March 2021, he was appointed as manager of Atenas de San Carlos of the Uruguayan Segunda División. On 16 September 2021, after a 2–1 loss to Rampla Juniors, he was released.

Personal life
Forlán was born into a family of footballers – his father Pablo having played for Peñarol (1963–1970), São Paulo (1970–1975) and Uruguay in the 1966 and 1974 World Cups, and his maternal grandfather, Juan Carlos Corazzo, for Independiente in Argentina. Forlán is of Italian, Basque, and Irish descent, and because of his Basque ancestry from his grandmother, he was linked to Athletic Bilbao after his departure from Manchester United, even though the club only permits Basque players. His nickname is Cachavacha, a witch who is one of the antagonists from the Argentine cartoon series The Adventures of Hijitus.

He is a founding member of Fundación Alejandra Forlán, an organization headed by his sister that promotes safer driving.

In 2009, Forlán appeared in a music video for Coti starring alongside Argentine footballer Maxi Rodríguez. In 2021, Forlán began playing amateur football for the Old Boys Club, which came about because his children attend The British Schools of Montevideo.

Relationships
Forlán announced on 9 March 2011 on his official Twitter page that he and Argentinian model/actress Zaira Nara were engaged to be married. In June 2011, however, Forlán and Nara announced they were breaking their engagement. No reason was released for the breakup.

Forlán is married to Paz Cardoso and together the pair have two sons, Martín, in February 2016, and César, in February 2019, and a daughter, Luz, in May 2017.

Career statistics

Club
Source:

International
Source:

Scores and results list Uruguay's goal tally first.

Managerial statistics

Honours
Manchester United
Premier League: 2002–03
FA Cup: 2003–04
FA Community Shield: 2003

Villarreal
UEFA Intertoto Cup: 2004

Atlético Madrid
UEFA Europa League: 2009–10
UEFA Super Cup: 2010

Internacional
Campeonato Gaúcho: 2013

Peñarol
Primera División: 2015–16

Kitchee
Hong Kong Premier League: 2017–18

Uruguay
Copa América: 2011

Individual
La Liga Ibero-American Player of the Year: 2004–05
Pichichi Trophy: 2004–05, 2008–09
European Golden Shoe: 2004–05, 2008–09
FIFA World Cup Golden Ball: 2010
FIFA World Cup Goal of the Tournament: 2010
FIFA World Cup Golden Boot: 2010
FIFA World Cup Dream Team: 2010
UEFA Europa League Final Man of The Match: 2010
Campeonato Gaúcho Top Scorer: 2013
*2004-05 European Golden Shoe was jointly shared with Thierry Henry
*2010 FIFA World Cup Golden Boot was jointly shared with Thomas Müller, Wesley Sneijder and David Villa

See also
 List of footballers with 100 or more caps

References

External links

 
 
 

 
 

1979 births
Living people
Uruguayan people of Basque descent
Uruguayan people of Italian descent
Uruguayan people of Irish descent
Uruguayan people of Spanish descent
Footballers from Montevideo
Uruguayan footballers
Association football forwards
Association football midfielders
Club Atlético Independiente footballers
Manchester United F.C. players
Villarreal CF players
Atlético Madrid footballers
Inter Milan players
Sport Club Internacional players
Cerezo Osaka players
Peñarol players
Mumbai City FC players
Kitchee SC players
Argentine Primera División players
Premier League players
La Liga players
Serie A players
Campeonato Brasileiro Série A players
J1 League players
J2 League players
Uruguayan Primera División players
Indian Super League players
Hong Kong Premier League players
Pichichi Trophy winners
UEFA Europa League winning players
Uruguay under-20 international footballers
Uruguay international footballers
2002 FIFA World Cup players
2004 Copa América players
2007 Copa América players
2010 FIFA World Cup players
2011 Copa América players
2013 FIFA Confederations Cup players
2014 FIFA World Cup players
Copa América-winning players
FIFA Century Club
Uruguayan expatriate footballers
Uruguayan expatriate sportspeople in Argentina
Uruguayan expatriate sportspeople in England
Uruguayan expatriate sportspeople in Spain
Uruguayan expatriate sportspeople in Italy
Uruguayan expatriate sportspeople in Brazil
Uruguayan expatriate sportspeople in Japan
Uruguayan expatriate sportspeople in India
Uruguayan expatriate sportspeople in Hong Kong
Expatriate footballers in Argentina
Expatriate footballers in England
Expatriate footballers in Spain
Expatriate footballers in Italy
Expatriate footballers in Brazil
Expatriate footballers in Japan
Expatriate footballers in India
Expatriate footballers in Hong Kong
Collars of the Order of Isabella the Catholic
People named in the Panama Papers